William Elric Boivin (October 21, 1914 – January 28, 2014) was a Canadian football player who played for the Winnipeg Blue Bombers. He won the Grey Cup with them in 1939 and 1941. He was also a director of the BC Lions and general manager of the Blue Bombers (1955–1957).

References

1914 births
2014 deaths
People from Saint Boniface, Winnipeg
Canadian football running backs
Winnipeg Blue Bombers general managers
Winnipeg Blue Bombers players
Canadian football people from Winnipeg
Players of Canadian football from Manitoba